Urchin or urcheon is the Middle English term for "hedgehog". It may refer to:

Common meanings
 Street children, homeless children
 Sea urchins, spiny sea creatures

Arts and entertainment
 Urchin (band), a band led by Dave Murray and Adrian Smith of Iron Maiden
 Urchin (album), a 1998 album by Inga Liljeström
 Urchin (film), a 2007 film about a homeless boy living underground, by John Harlacher
 Urchin, the squirrel protagonist in The Mistmantle Chronicles book series
 Urchin, an enemy in the 1990 video game Super Mario World
 Urchin (Dungeons & Dragons), a type of monster in the Dungeons & Dragons role-playing game
 "Urchin", a song by Arca from Arca

Other uses
 HMS Urchin, five ships of the British Royal Navy
 Urchin Software Corporation, a US web analytics company owned by Google
 Urchin (software), a series of web analytics developed by the Urchin Software Corporation (now Google Analytics)
 Urchin (detonator), code name for the device that triggered the detonation of the earliest plutonium atomic bombs
 The Urchins, English hooligan firm associated with Liverpool F.C.
 Urchin Rock, off the coast of Graham Land, Antarctica

See also
 Sea Urchin (disambiguation)